Gounda Airport  was a rural airstrip in the Bamingui-Bangoran prefecture of the Central African Republic.

See also

Transport in the Central African Republic
List of airports in the Central African Republic

References

External links 
HERE Maps - Gounda Airport

Defunct airports
Airports in the Central African Republic
Buildings and structures in Bamingui-Bangoran